Ada Benjamin (born 18 May 1994) is a Nigerian athlete, specializing in sprinting.

Life  
In 2014, at the Commonwealth Games in Glasgow she won the silver medal in the 4 × 400 m relay with Patience Okon George, Regina George and Folashade Abugan.

She is studying at University of Texas, El Paso (UTEP), majoring in business. Benjamin is a member of the UTEP's indoor and outdoor track team.

Medals

References

External links 
 
 
 

Living people
1994 births
Sportspeople from Lagos
Commonwealth Games medallists in athletics
Commonwealth Games silver medallists for Nigeria
Athletes (track and field) at the 2014 Commonwealth Games
Nigerian female sprinters
Igbo people
21st-century Nigerian women
Medallists at the 2014 Commonwealth Games